Lee Kyu-han (born August 4, 1980) is a South Korean actor. He made his acting debut in 1998, but first drew viewers' attention in 2005 as the heroine's ex-boyfriend in romantic comedy My Lovely Sam Soon, later going on to more high-profile supporting roles in Que Sera, Sera (2007), Smile, You (2009), and More Charming by the Day (2010). Lee has since played leading roles in the television dramas The Wedding Scheme (2012), The Birth of a Family (2012), and Only Love (2014). Appearances on variety-reality shows such as the second season of Real Men in 2015 further boosted his popularity. And he was further known for his role as Baek Seok in a 2015–2016 drama series I Have a Lover.

Filmography

Film

Television series

Television show

Music video

Awards and nominations

References

External links

 Lee Kyu-han at Family Actors Entertainment 
 Lee Kyu-han Fan Cafe at Daum 
 
 
 

1980 births
Living people
South Korean male television actors
South Korean male film actors
Mystic Entertainment artists